This is a list of awards and nominations received by American actress and singer Audra McDonald. She is winner of six Tony Awards, two Grammy Awards and a Primetime Emmy Award.

Active in stage productions and musicals since the 1990s, McDonald has garnered widespread acclaim and critical support for her performances, being honoured with numerous awards, including the Golden Plate Award of the American Academy of Achievement (2012) and induction into the American Theater Hall of Fame (2017).

McDonald has performed in musicals, operas, and stage dramas such as A Moon for the Misbegotten, 110 in the Shade, Dreamgirls, Carousel, Ragtime, Master Class, Porgy and Bess, Lady Day at Emerson's Bar and Grill, becoming the most awarded actress of the Tony Awards with six awards, becoming the only person to win all four acting categories. She was also recipient of the Sarah Siddons Distinguished Achievement in the Theatre Award, six Drama Desk Award and five Outer Critics Circle Award. Thanks for her musical and opera performance, McDonald was nominated for three Grammy Awards, winning two times for Best Classical Album and Best Opera Recording for Rise and Fall of the City of Mahagonny Soundtrack.

McDonald starred in televisions series and motion pictures, including Wit (2001), which gave her her first Primetime Emmy Awards nomination for Outstanding Supporting Actress in a Miniseries or a Movie. She acted in A Raisin in the Sun, earning nominations at the Primetime Emmy Awards and NAACP Image Awards, and as Dr. Naomi Bennett in television series Private Practice, being nominated three times for Outstanding Actress in a Drama Series at the NAACP Image Awards. Since 2012, McDonald has served as host for the PBS series Live from Lincoln Center, for which she won a Primetime Emmy Award for Outstanding Special Class Program with the show's producers for Sweeney Todd, aired in 2015.

In 2016 McDonald starred as Billie Holiday in filmed stage production Lady Day at Emerson's Bar and Grill, receiving price from the critics, earning nominations at the Primetime Emmy Award for Outstanding Lead Actress in a Limited or Anthology Series or Movie and an at the Screen Actors Guild Award for Outstanding Performance by a Female Actor in a Television Movie or Limited Series. Since 2017, McDonald joyned the cast of The Good Fight, being nominated two times for at the Critics' Choice Television Award for Best Supporting Actress in a Drama Series. In 2021 she starred as Barbara Siggers Franklin in Aretha Franklin's biographical musical drama film Respect, earning a nomination at the NAACP Image Award for Outstanding Supporting Actress in a Motion Picture.

Major Association

Grammy Awards

Emmy Awards

Screen Actors Guild Awards

Tony Award

Other associations

Antonyo Award

Black Reel Awards

Critics' Choice Television Awards

Drama Desk Award

Drama League Award

NAACP Image Award

Satellite Awards

Theatre World Award

Critics awards

Notes

References

External links 

 

Lists of awards received by American actor
Lists of awards received by American musician